Gigi (full title Hank Jones Swings Songs from Lerner and Loewe's Gigi ) is an album by American jazz pianist Hank Jones featuring jazz adaptations of tunes from Alan Jay Lerner and Frederick Loewe's musical romantic comedy film Gigi recorded in 1958 and released on the Golden Crest label.

Reception

Allmusic awarded the album 3 stars.

Track listing
All compositions by Frederick Loewe and Alan Jay Lerner
 "Gigi" - 3:14
 "I'm Not Young Any More" -  3:37
 "Thank Heaven for Little Girls"  - 2:12
 "It's a Bore" - 2:58
 "Say a Prayer for Me Tonight" - 3:07
 "Gossip" - 2:15
 "Waltz at Maxim's (She's Not Thinking of Me)" -  2:16
 "The Parisians" 1:25
 "I Remember it Well" - 2:30
 "The Night They Invented Champagne" - 1:38

Personnel 
Hank Jones - piano
Barry Galbraith - guitar 
Arnold Fishkin - bass
Donald Lamond - drums

References 

1958 albums
Hank Jones albums